Jim Williamson may refer to:

Jim Williamson (association footballer) (1926–2005), 1940s footballer for Tranmere Rovers
Jim Williamson (footballer, born January 1909) (1909–1983), Australian rules footballer for St Kilda and Geelong
Jim Williamson (footballer, born February 1909) (1909–2003), Australian rules footballer for Carlton
Jim Williamson (footballer, born 1876) (1876–1956), Australian rules footballer for South Melbourne

See also
James Williamson (disambiguation)